Raba (Indonesia: Kota Raba) is a town in the Bima Regency, on the eastern part of the island of Sumbawa, in central Indonesia's province West Nusa Tenggara. It is connected by provincial road to Bima and Sape.

Geography
The city is located on the eastern part of the Sumbawa island.

Administration
The city is divided into districts.

References

External links 
 

Populated places in West Nusa Tenggara